The Countess of Paris (German: Die Gräfin von Paris) is a 1923 German silent film directed by Dimitri Buchowetzki and Joe May and starring Mia May, Emil Jannings and Erika Glässner. It was the sequel to Tragedy of Love.

The film's sets were designed by the art director Paul Leni.

Cast
Mia May as Gräfin Manon Moreau
Emil Jannings as Ombrade
Erika Glässner as Musette
Vladimir Gajdarov as André Rabatin
Charlotte Ander as Kitty Moreau 
Irmgard Bern as Yvonne
Hedwig Pauly-Winterstein as Countess Adrienne Moreau
Ida Wüst as Madame de la Roquére
Rudolf Forster as Count François Moreau
Curt Goetz as Prosecutor
Arnold Korff as Henry Beaufort, detective
Eugen Rex as Jean, Moreau's servant
Hermann Vallentin as police inspector
Kurt Vespermann as Senior Prosecutor
Marlene Dietrich as Lucie
Loni Nest as Kitty - child

References

External links

Films of the Weimar Republic
Films directed by Dimitri Buchowetzki
Films directed by Joe May
German silent feature films
German sequel films
German black-and-white films
Films set in Paris
UFA GmbH films